Dan Raspler is an editor and writer of comic books for DC Comics. In the late 1990s, he created the series Young Heroes in Love.

Awards
 1997: Won "Best Editor" Eisner Award, for Kingdom Come, Hitman, The Spectre, Sergio Aragonés Destroys DC

Personal life
Raspler is the cousin of writer Chris Claremont's current wife. Raspler was editor on JLA during the six-issue "Tenth Circle" story arc Claremont and John Byrne wrote in 2004. Dan co-designed the game Space Cadets:Away Missions for Stronghold Games released in 2015.

Notes

References

External links
 

Eisner Award winners
Living people
American comics writers
Year of birth missing (living people)